In the 1977 edition, the Philippines together with Brunei and Indonesia were finally admitted into the SEAP Games Federation and all debuted in the now so-called Southeast Asian Games. The word "Peninsula" was omitted as a new federation title to reflect the expansion. All three debutant countries participated in the 9th Southeast Asian Games that was held from 19 to 26 November 1977 at Kuala Lumpur, Malaysia.

SEA Games performance

Medalists

Gold

Silver

Bronze

Multiple

Medal summary

By sports

References

External links
 History of the SEA Games

1977 in Philippine sport
Nations at the 1977 Southeast Asian Games
Philippines at the Southeast Asian Games